The 57th parallel north is a circle of latitude that is 57 degrees north of the Earth's equatorial plane. It crosses Europe, Asia, the Pacific Ocean, North America, and the Atlantic Ocean.

At this latitude the sun is visible for 17 hours, 53 minutes during the summer solstice and 6 hours, 43 minutes during the winter solstice. During the summer solstice, nighttime does not get beyond nautical twilight, a condition which lasts throughout the month of June. Everyday of the month of April can view both astronomical dawn and dusk.

The maximum altitude of the Sun is > 18.00º in October and > 11.00º in November.

The only capital city on the 57th parallel north is Riga.

Around the world
Starting at the Prime Meridian and heading eastwards, the parallel 57° north passes through:

{| class="wikitable plainrowheaders"
! scope="col" width="125" | Co-ordinates
! scope="col" | Country, territory or ocean
! scope="col" | Notes
|-
| style="background:#b0e0e6;" | 
! scope="row" style="background:#b0e0e6;" | Atlantic Ocean
| style="background:#b0e0e6;" | North Sea
|-
| 
! scope="row" | 
| North Jutlandic Island and Jutland mainland
|-
| style="background:#b0e0e6;" | 
! scope="row" style="background:#b0e0e6;" | Atlantic Ocean
| style="background:#b0e0e6;" | Kattegat
|-
| 
! scope="row" | 
| Halland, Jönköping, Kronoberg and Kalmar counties
|-
| style="background:#b0e0e6;" | 
! scope="row" style="background:#b0e0e6;" | Atlantic Ocean
| style="background:#b0e0e6;" | Kalmar Strait, Baltic Sea
|-
| 
! scope="row" | 
| Island of Öland
|-
| style="background:#b0e0e6;" | 
! scope="row" style="background:#b0e0e6;" | Atlantic Ocean
| style="background:#b0e0e6;" | Baltic Sea
|-
| 
! scope="row" | 
| Island of Gotland
|-
| style="background:#b0e0e6;" | 
! scope="row" style="background:#b0e0e6;" | Atlantic Ocean
| style="background:#b0e0e6;" | Baltic Sea
|-
| 
! scope="row" | 
| Courland, Semigallia
|-
| style="background:#b0e0e6;" | 
! scope="row" style="background:#b0e0e6;" | Atlantic Ocean
| style="background:#b0e0e6;" | Gulf of Riga, Baltic Sea
|-
| 
! scope="row" | 
| Passing through Riga. Vidzeme, Latgale
|-
| 
! scope="row" | 
| Passing through Ivanovo
|-
| style="background:#b0e0e6;" | 
! scope="row" style="background:#b0e0e6;" | Pacific Ocean
| style="background:#b0e0e6;" | Sea of Okhotsk
|-
| 
! scope="row" |  
| Kamchatka Peninsula
|-
| style="background:#b0e0e6;" | 
! scope="row" style="background:#b0e0e6;" | Pacific Ocean
| style="background:#b0e0e6;" | Bering SeaPassing just south of Otter Island and Saint Paul Island, Alaska, 
|-
| 
! scope="row" | 
| Alaska - Alaska Peninsula
|-
| style="background:#b0e0e6;" | 
! scope="row" style="background:#b0e0e6;" | Pacific Ocean
| style="background:#b0e0e6;" | Gulf of Alaska
|-
| 
! scope="row" | 
| Alaska - Kodiak Island and Sitkalidak Island
|-
| style="background:#b0e0e6;" | 
! scope="row" style="background:#b0e0e6;" | Pacific Ocean
| style="background:#b0e0e6;" | Gulf of Alaska
|-
| 
! scope="row" | 
| Alaska - Kruzof Island
|-
| style="background:#b0e0e6;" | 
! scope="row" style="background:#b0e0e6;" | Pacific Ocean
| style="background:#b0e0e6;" | Sitka Sound
|-
| 
! scope="row" | 
| Alaska - Baranof Island
|-
| style="background:#b0e0e6;" | 
! scope="row" style="background:#b0e0e6;" rowspan="2" | Pacific Ocean
| style="background:#b0e0e6;" | Chatham StraitPassing just south of Admiralty Island, Alaska, 
|-
| style="background:#b0e0e6;" | 
| style="background:#b0e0e6;" | Frederick Sound
|-
| 
! scope="row" | 
| Alaska - Kupreanof Island and the Alaska Panhandle
|-
| 
! scope="row" | 
| British Columbia, Alberta, Saskatchewan, Manitoba
|-
| style="background:#b0e0e6;" | 
! scope="row" style="background:#b0e0e6;" | Arctic Ocean
| style="background:#b0e0e6;" | Hudson BayPassing just north of the Belcher Islands, Nunavut, 
|-
| 
! scope="row" | 
| Nunavut, Quebec, Newfoundland and Labrador
|-
| style="background:#b0e0e6;" | 
! scope="row" style="background:#b0e0e6;" | Atlantic Ocean
| style="background:#b0e0e6;" |
|-
| 
! scope="row" | 
| Island of Barra, 
|-
| style="background:#b0e0e6;" | 
! scope="row" style="background:#b0e0e6;" | Atlantic Ocean
| style="background:#b0e0e6;" | Sea of the Hebrides
|-
| 
! scope="row" | 
| Island of Rùm, 
|-
| style="background:#b0e0e6;" | 
! scope="row" style="background:#b0e0e6;" | Atlantic Ocean
| style="background:#b0e0e6;" | Sea of the Hebrides
|-
| 
! scope="row" | 
| 
|-
| style="background:#b0e0e6;" | 
! scope="row" style="background:#b0e0e6;" | Atlantic Ocean
| style="background:#b0e0e6;" | North Sea
|}

See also
56th parallel north
58th parallel north

References

n57